The 1983–84 Algerian Championnat National was the 22nd season of the Algerian Championnat National since its establishment in 1962. A total of 16 teams contested the league, with JE Tizi-Ouzou as the defending champions, The Championnat started on September 2, 1983 and ended on June 8, 1984.

Team summaries

Promotion and relegation 
Teams promoted from Algerian Division 2 1983–1984 
 WM Tlemcen
 USM Annaba
 AM Aïn M'lila
 JCM Tiaret

Teams relegated to Algerian Division 2 1984–1985
 No relegated

League table

References

External links
1983–84 Algerian Championnat National

Algerian Championnat National
Championnat National
Algerian Ligue Professionnelle 1 seasons